Bakić may refer to:

Bakić (surname)
Bakić noble family, Serbian early-modern-period nobility
Bakić, Croatia, a village in Slavonia, Croatia